Ciridops is an extinct genus of Hawaiian honeycreeper species that occurred in prehistoric and historic times on the Hawaiian islands of Hawaii, Molokai, Kauai and Oahu. This genus was created in 1892 by Alfred Newton in an article published by the journal Nature  on the basis of the ʻula-ʻai-hawane, which was named Fringilla anna by Sanford B. Dole in 1879.

The bill of these birds was strong. The culmen was arched, and the maxilla overlapped the mandible at the base. The nostrils were covered by a membrane. The wings were large and the tail was moderate with pointed rectrices. The nearest relatives might have been from the genus Loxops.

The ʻula-ʻai-hawane, which was last seen in 1892, is the only species that survived into historic times, three others Ciridops cf. anna from Molokai, Ciridops sp. from Oahu, and the stout-legged finch (Ciridops tenax) from Kauai are only known from subfossil remains found in late quaternary deposits.

Species
ʻUla-ʻai-hawane (Ciridops anna) (Dole, 1879)
Stout-legged finch (Ciridops tenax) Olson & James, 1991
Ciridops cf. anna (on Molokai) Olson & James, 1991
Ciridops sp. (on Oahu) Olson & James, 1991

References

Further reading
H. Douglas Pratt, Jack Jeffrey: The Hawaiian Honeycreepers  Oxford University Press, 2005 
Scott B Wilson & Arthur Humble Evans: Aves Hawaiienses: The Birds of the Sandwich Islands. 1890–99. R. H. Porter, London (Reprint: Ayer Publishing, 1974 )
Storrs L. Olson: History, Structure, Evolution, Behavior, Distribution, and Ecology of the Extinct Hawaiian Genus Ciridops (Fringillidae, Carduelini, Drepanidini).  The Wilson Journal of Ornithology, December 2012, Vol. 124, No. 4, pp. 651–674 
 

 
Hawaiian honeycreepers
Endemic fauna of Hawaii
Extinct birds of Hawaii
Bird genera
Bird extinctions since 1500
Holocene extinctions
Carduelinae
Higher-level bird taxa restricted to the Australasia-Pacific region
Prehistoric birds of Oceania